Potassium voltage-gated channel subfamily A member 2 also known as Kv1.2 is a protein that in humans is encoded by the KCNA2 gene.

Function 

Potassium channels represent the most complex class of voltage-gated ion channels from both functional and structural standpoints. Their diverse functions include regulating neurotransmitter release, heart rate, insulin secretion, neuronal excitability, epithelial electrolyte transport, smooth muscle contraction, and cell volume. Four sequence-related potassium channel genes - shaker, shaw, shab, and shal - have been identified in Drosophila, and each has been shown to have human homolog(s). This gene encodes a member of the potassium channel, voltage-gated, shaker-related subfamily. This member contains six membrane-spanning domains with a shaker-type repeat in the fourth segment. It belongs to the delayed rectifier class, members of which allow nerve cells to efficiently repolarize following an action potential. The coding region of this gene is intronless, and the gene is clustered with genes KCNA3 and KCNA10 on chromosome 1.

Interactions 

KCNA2 has been shown to interact with KCNA4, DLG4, PTPRA, KCNAB2, RHOA and Cortactin.

Clinical

Mutations in this gene have been associated with hereditary spastic paraplegia.

See also 
 Voltage-gated potassium channel
 Pandinotoxin

References

Further reading

External links 
 
 

Ion channels